Pustakari is a Nepali candy, which is made from molasses, which is cooked with ghee, milk and topped with coconut, dates or nuts. In Kathmandu valley, where the Newar confectioners have refined the art of preparing it, it is known in Nepal Bhasa as 'postikan'.

See also
 List of Nepalese dishes

References

Nepalese cuisine